Matthew 'Matt' Maddox is an American business executive and entrepreneur. He is the former CEO of Wynn Resorts, Ltd., the American publicly traded developer and operator of higher-end hotels and casinos. In November 2021, he announced his intention to step down as CEO of Wynn Resorts effective January 31, 2022.

He previously served as the company's president and chief financial officer from 2013 until he took office as CEO on February 6, 2018, following the resignation of Steve Wynn. In August 2018, Maddox joined the Wynn Resorts board of directors.

Early life and education
Maddox received a Bachelor's in finance from Southern Methodist University.  He attended Mena High School, Arkansas.

Career
Maddox began his career as an investment banker at Bank of America.  His first stint in the gaming industry was at Park Place Entertainment (later Caesars) as director of finance.

Maddox joined Wynn Resorts at its founding in 2002.  He served as vice president of investor relations and treasurer while helping secure the financing required to launch Wynn.  In 2003, he relocated to Macau to build Wynn Resorts Macau as its chief financial officer. In 2013 he was additionally appointed president and chief financial officer of Wynn Resorts, following which he was involved in building the Wynn Palace in Cotai, Macau.  In 2018 he was appointed CEO of Wynn Resorts following the resignation of founder Steve Wynn.

In November 2021, Mr. Maddox announced his intention to step down as CEO of Wynn Resorts, effective January 31, 2022. The Company's Board of Directors asked Mr. Maddox to remain on the Wynn Macau, Limited and the Wynn Interactive Boards of Directors, as well as a consultant to Wynn Resorts.

References 

Living people
American casino industry businesspeople
American chief executives of travel and tourism industry companies
Southern Methodist University alumni
Year of birth missing (living people)